Chikoti Chirwa (born 9 March 1992) is a Malawian footballer who plays as a defensive midfielder for Red Lions and the Malawi national team. He was included in Malawi's squad for the 2021 Africa Cup of Nations.

References

External links

1992 births
Living people
Malawian footballers
Malawi international footballers
Association football midfielders
Red Lions FC (Malawi) players
Kamuzu Barracks FC players
2021 Africa Cup of Nations players